Battsek is a surname. Notable people with the surname include:

Daniel Battsek (born 1958), British film producer and executive
John Battsek, British documentary film producer